Battle Maximus is the thirteenth studio album by Gwar. The album was released on September 17, 2013 through Metal Blade Records. The album was the first to feature new guitarist Brent Purgason (of Cannabis Corpse), portraying the new character Pustulus Maximus, the first album to feature bassist Jamison Land, portraying longtime character, Beefcake the Mighty, and the last to feature vocalist Dave Brockie who portrayed Oderus Urungus, due to Brockie's death from a heroin overdose on March 23, 2014.

Overview
The album's description reads:

"Battle Maximus" was conceived and recorded over the last year at the bands self-operated Slave Pit Studios, and was mixed by veteran metal producer Glen Robinson and mastered by the matchless Howie Weinberg. It features twelve brand-new tracks of sonic sedition guaranteed to make even the most hardened GWAR fans head explode, merely by looking at the packaging. With songs like "Madness at the Core of Time", "Torture", and "They Swallowed the Sun", the album not only tells the next chapter in the never-ending story of GWAR, but also stands as a tribute to the band's long-time guitar player, the incomparable Flattus Maximus, who left Earth and returned to the cosmos to fulfill his glorious destiny almost two years ago.

Rather than attempt to emulate the un-matchable sound of Flattus, who had led the band from the depths of clown-rock to the elite tier of top-notch metal acts with a series of bone-crushing recordings starting with 2000's "Violence Has Arrived", Oderus and company struck out in a bold new direction. Enlisting the aid of Pustulus Maximus, cousin of Flattus, who wrested the right to join forces with GWAR after waging the epic "Battle Maximus", GWAR has created one of their most awe-inspiring albums to date, one that is sure to join the ranks of "Scumdogs of the Universe" and "Lust in Space", as the ultimate expressions of GWAR's contempt for modern society and the hypocrisy and horror of a world gone mad.

Get ready, human scum...GWAR is coming...all over your face!"

The album features several guest guitarists on the title track, each under a new Maximus character. Zach Blair, who portrayed Flattus Maximus before Cory Smoot, provides additional guitar ono several songs as the character Splattus Maximus. Todd Evans, a former Beefcake the Mighty, also appears as Skookum Maximus.

Track listing

Personnel 
 Dave Brockie (Oderus Urungus) - lead vocals
 Brent Purgason (Pustulus Maximus) - lead guitar, backing vocals
 Mike Derks (Balsac the Jaws of Death) - rhythm guitar, backing vocals
 Jamison Land (Beefcake the Mighty) - bass, backing vocals
 Brad Roberts (Jizmak Da Gusha) - drums, percussion
 Bob Gorman (Bonesnapper) - lead vocals on "I, Bonesnapper"
 Zach Blair (Splattus Maximus) - additional guitar on "Intro", "Bloodbath", "Torture", "Raped at Birth", "Battle Maximus", and "Falling"
 Todd Evans (Skookum Maximus) - additional guitar on "Battle Maximus", and "Nothing Left Alive"
 Ol Drake (Twatticus Maximus) - additional guitar on "Battle Maximus"
 Mark Duane Morton (Tyrone Der Teufel) - additional guitar on "Battle Maximus"
 Jenna Anderson (Jadis Valkyrja) - additional vocals on "They Swallowed The Sun" and "Carry On"
 John Angelo - Producer / Recording Engineer
 Glen Robinson - Mix Engineer
 Howie Weinberg - Mastering Engineer

References 

2013 albums
Gwar albums
Metal Blade Records albums